Bamum (Shü Pamom  "language of the Bamum", or Shümom "Mum language"), also spelled Bamun or in its French spelling Bamoun, is an Eastern Grassfields language of Cameroon, with approximately 420,000 speakers. The language is well known for its original script developed by King Njoya and his palace circle in the Kingdom of Bamum around 1895. Cameroonian musician Claude Ndam was a native speaker of the language and sang it in his music.

Phonology
Bamum has tone, vowel length, diphthongs and coda consonants.

Vowels 
The simple vowels are:

Bamum vowels can be normal or half-long /ˑ/.

Consonants
The consonants are:

Tones 

Bamum has five tones

References

Languages of Cameroon
Languages of Nigeria
Nun languages